NBA steals leader may refer to:
List of National Basketball Association annual steals leaders
List of National Basketball Association career steals leaders
List of National Basketball Association career playoff steals leaders
List of National Basketball Association single-game steals leaders